The Mazda MX-5 (ND) is the fourth and current generation of the Mazda MX-5. Mazda officially unveiled the car on September 3, 2014, in the United States and Spain, and on September 4, 2014, in Japan. The new MX-5 was presented at the October 2014 Paris Motor Show, and at the November 2014 Los Angeles Auto Show. The car is manufactured in Mazda's Hiroshima plant since March 4, 2015. The vehicle was released in the third quarter of 2015. In the US, the release price of the MX-5 was between $24,915 and $30,065. On March 24, 2016 the MX-5 was awarded World Car of the Year (WCOTY) and the World Car Design of the Year at the New York Auto Show. It was the second Mazda to win WCOTY following the Demio/Mazda2 in 2008.

Overview

The fourth generation MX-5 is  shorter and  lighter than its predecessor, putting the vehicle's curb weight near . Incorporating Mazda's Skyactiv technology, the Miata is offered with a choice of two direct injection, naturally aspirated petrol engines. Mazda also replaced the hydraulic power steering system that the previous Miatas had with their new Electric Power Assisted Steering (EPAS) system.

The car was launched with a six-speed manual shift transmission and a six-speed automatic transmission. The cockpit, steering wheel, and infotainment system are very similar to the 2014 Mazda3. The MX-5 is fitted as standard with a manually operated fabric roof that can be opened or closed within a few seconds.

All variants can be had with a MT or AT, with the MT fuel efficiency of  City and  Highway. The AT performs slightly better, at   City and  Highway.

In 2019, a GT-S trim was introduced bringing the Club trim's limited-slip differential, Bilstein shock absorbers, and strut tower brace to the GT trim as well as a black roof on all RF models. In 2020, these became standard features in the GT trim, and the separate GT-S designation was retired.

The MX-5 (ND) has been very popular with diecast manufacturers like Tomica, Hot Wheels, and Matchbox, with all three companies releasing their own versions of the car to the market.

MX-5 RF

In late 2016, a new MX-5 RF (Retractable Fastback) model was announced. It features a rigid roof and buttresses that give the silhouette a more coupé-like appearance than the soft top convertible. The top panel of the roof folds back while the buttresses remain in place, similar to a Targa top. Antecedents for the flying buttresses design are found in the Chevrolet Corvette (C3) T-top coupé and the Ferrari Dino 206 GT and 246 GT. The interior of the MX-5 RF model is almost the same as the soft top, with the same media screen, seats, steering wheel and switchgear, and the trunk volume is the same as the soft top. Differences include a full circle colored digital gauge in place of the soft top's semi-rectangular, half-digital, mono-colored display. The storage cubby behind the drivers seat has been eliminated, and the cubby behind the passenger seat as well as the glove box behind the center console have been made shallower to make room for the roof mechanism. The MX-5 RF uses the same engines as the soft top model and offers similar performance. The MX-5 RF also introduced a new 'Machine Grey Mica' paint.

A limited edition run of 500 models was introduced with the launch of the Mazda MX-5 RF. Called the 'Launch Edition' these models were priced at £28,995 and were only available with the  2.0-litre engine. These models included BBS alloy wheels, a twin-tone roof, black door mirrors and rear spoiler as well as Recaro seats. This version was only available in two colours: 'Soul Red' or 'Machine Grey'. It was the first time since the original NA series MX-5 was available with a companion body style since the Mazda MX-3 which was a hatchback sport coupe.

Cooperation with Fiat Chrysler
A joint venture with Alfa Romeo on a joint rear-wheel drive platform was announced in 2012, but cancelled in 2014. Fiat Chrysler announced the Fiat 124 Spider and Abarth 124 Spider, both based on the Mazda ND platform, in 2015.

In 2016, the Detroit News stated "in partnering with Mazda’s MX-5 Miata to resurrect the classic Fiat 124 Spider, Fiat Chrysler not only gained a halo sports car for its struggling Italian brand, but likely saved the most celebrated small sports car of the past 25 years (the MX-5)" — citing the markedly increased cost of developing a new car at the time and "the costliest wave of government regulation since the 1970s."

2018 update
Externally, the car received a burgundy soft top and black 17" wheels. Interior upgrades include a telescoping steering column, a standard reverse camera, a reworked door opening mechanism, revised seat controls, and redesigned cupholders.

2021 update
In December 2021, Mazda announced that the 2022 model year MX-5 will feature Kinematic Posture Control (KPC), a new technology that improves steering response and body roll by applying single-wheel rear braking during high-g cornering.

Special editions

Mazda MX-5 Icon (2016)
Released in the UK as the fourth MX-5 to wear the "Icon" badge (others were 2000, 2005 and 2007 models). It was based on a 1.5-l SE-L model. The interior had red stitching on the leather, special floor mats and a plaque in the centre console. It was available in Meteor Grey Mica or Crystal White Pearlescent and featured chequered decals along the sides along with Soul Red paint on the front air dam, mirror caps and spoiler, finished with 16-inch Gunmetal alloy wheels. Production was limited to 600 cars.

Mazda MX-5 Levanto (2016)
Inspired by the 1966 film The Endless Summer, this one-off collaboration with Garage Italia Customs features a unique indigo blue fading to bright orange paint job. In addition, the interior is re-trimmed in Japanese blue denim with blue Alcantara and orange stitching.

Mazda MX-5 Z-Sport (2018)
The Z-Sport is characterised by their otherwise-unavailable combination of 17-inch BBS alloy wheels, metallic 'Machine' grey paint and cherry-red soft-top roof. It also came with sand-coloured leather upholstery, a numbered "Z-Sport" dashboard plaque, and "Z-Sport" logos on the door sills and floor mats.
It was essentially the same as a Sports Nav 2.0 model, with additions available on the upgrade list.

Mazda MX-5 Yamamoto Signature (2018)
This Italy-exclusive model is a tribute to Mazda MX-5 Ambassador Nobuhiro Yamamoto and is available only with the 1.5 L engine. It comes only in Jet Black with red highlights, a Mazdaspeed aero kit, a red engine bay brace and oil cap, and a special badge on the driver's side door behind the side mirror. The interior features black and red Alcantara trim with an embroidered reproduction of Yamamoto's signature. Optional upgrades include an Öhlins suspension, 16" Enkei RPF1 wheels in Toyo R888R 205/50ZR16 semi-slick tires, 280 mm brake discs with Brembo 4-piston front calipers, Nissin rear calipers, and stainless steel braided hoses. Only four examples of this model were released.

Mazda MX-5 30th Anniversary Edition (2019)

To celebrate the 30th anniversary of the MX-5, Mazda released a limited edition variant of the ND. The MX-5 Miata 30th Anniversary Edition debuted at the 2019 Chicago Auto Show on 7 February. The car comes in an exclusive Racing Orange color with a special numbering badge, as well as specially engraved Rays Engineering forged aluminum wheels and updated orange Brembo front and orange Nissin rear brake calipers. Each U.S. market owner was able to configure their 30th Anniversary Edition MX-5 before placing a $500 deposit. Of the 3,000 worldwide units, only 500 examples were allocated to the U.S., but after feedback from buyers, Mazda announced that an additional 143 units will be allocated for the U.S. market. 165 examples were exported to Canada, 30 went to Australia, and 30 were sold in the Philippines - including the 3,000th unit.

Mazda MX-5 Eunos Edition (2020)
Available exclusively in France with a limited run of 110 units, the MX-5 Eunos Edition features a Jet Black Mica exterior, burgundy Napa leather interior, and black Rays Engineering wheels as an homage to the Eunos brand and the 1992 S-Limited Roadster.

Mazda MX-5 100th Anniversary (2020 / 2021)
To commemorate Mazda's 100 year past and pay homage to their R360 Coupe, Mazda released the 100th Anniversary Mazda MX-5 Miata and MX-5 Miata RF in the third quarter of 2020. Based on their 2020 Grand Touring models this edition is only offered in their Snowflake White Pearl Mica colour and paired with their Garnet Red Napa leather seats. Canada received them for the 2021 model year. This colour combination was inspired by the original R360 Coupe. There are several interior accents with the special 100th Anniversary badges and logos throughout. The "100 YEARS 1920–2020" anniversary logo is imprinted in the headrest of the seats, and have it on the key fob, and central caps of the wheels. The "1920–2020" badges are throughout the car, it being on the red accent rugs, and front fenders of the car. The convertible version of this edition has the exclusive burgundy top, while the retractable fastback (RF) version will have a black piano top color. Less than 700 of these editions over all Mazda Models (MX-30, 2, 3, 6, CX-3, CX-30, CX-5, CX-9, and MX-5) are built and distributed worldwide.

Mazda MX-5 MCP 25th Anniversary Edition (2022)
Available exclusively in the Philippines to commemorate the 25th anniversary of Miata Club Philippines, the MX-5 MCP 25th Anniversary Edition features a Platinum Quartz Metallic exterior with a navy blue soft top and a red stripe. Each unit will come with a commemorative book highlighting the history of the car club.

Gallery

Specifications

Safety

Four airbags are fitted as standard, including torso airbags, pelvis airbags and head airbags for driver and passenger.  Headrests provide protection from whiplash.  A Vehicle Stability Control+ (VSC+), an 'active' hood for pedestrian protection and a Lane Departure Warning System (LDWS) are available. Since the MX-5 is a two-seater, the front passenger airbag can be disabled for safe transportation of children and the installation of a suitable rear-facing child seat restraint to be used in that position. In the Euro NCAP safety test, the MX suffered from a malfunctioning driver's airbag, which was unable to prevent the dummy from hitting the steering wheel. Its rating was 4 out of 5 stars.

Reception
The fourth generation MX-5 received praise from automotive journalists. Jeremy Clarkson, in his "Driving" column of The Sunday Times, gave the car five out of five stars, calling it an "engineering gem." He also commented that "It’s a cure for depression, this car, it really is. You just can’t be in a bad mood when you’re driving it."

Top Gear magazine gave the car a score of nine out of 10, calling it "A complete sweetie of a roadster, this is the best the MX-5 has been perhaps ever." The car also received perfect five star review ratings from Car and Driver and What Car? magazines.

Accolades
 Car of the Year Japan Award 2015-2016.
 Automobile magazine's "All-Stars" list in 2016.
 Car and Drivers 10Best list from 2016-2019.
 Yahoo! Autos 2016 Fresh Ride of the Year.
 Roadshow by CNET Editors Choice Best Convertibles 2016.
World Car of the Year at the 2016 World Car Awards (UK).
2016 World Car of the Year Awards: "World Car of the Year" and "World Car Design of the Year".
2016 UK Car of the Year.
The Daily Telegraph 2016 Car of the Year.
Auto Express 2017 Roadster of the Year.
Red Dot Best of the Best Award: Product Design 2017.
New York Daily News DNA Award 2018.
What Car? Magazine 2018 Best Convertible Less Than £25,000.
MotorWeek Drivers' Choice Awards Best Convertible 2018.
Edmunds.com 2019 Editor's Choice Awards: Best Sports Car.

References

External links

Mazda MX-5
Cars introduced in 2015

2020s cars
Euro NCAP roadster sports cars
Hardtop convertibles
Front mid-engine, rear-wheel-drive vehicles
Retro-style automobiles
Roadsters